Pierrot Langers (born 15 June 1949) is a retired Luxembourgian football striker.

References

1949 births
Living people
Luxembourgian footballers
FC Aris Bonnevoie players
FC Avenir Beggen players
Association football forwards
Luxembourg international footballers